The 1909–10 Illinois Fighting Illini men's basketball team represented the University of Illinois.

Regular season
For the first time since organized basketball became a sanctioned sport within the university, the Fighting Illini basketball team was led by a returning head coach.  Herb V. Juul remained as the head coach of a team that played only nine games, each being a conference game.  The Illini finished their season with a record of five wins, four losses and a fourth-place finish in the Western Conference.  The starting lineup for the team included Albert L. Hall and Henry J. Popperfuss as forwards, captain Carl P. Watson at center, and Louis S. Bernstein and Thomas Thompson as guards.

Roster

Source

Schedule
												
Source																

|-	
!colspan=9 style="background:#DF4E38; color:#FFFFFF;"|Big Ten regular season	
|- align="center" bgcolor=""

			

					

												

Bold Italic connotes conference game

References

Illinois Fighting Illini
Illinois Fighting Illini men's basketball seasons
Illinois Fighting Illini men's b
Illinois Fighting Illini men's b